Geoffrey Thomas Wright (25 March 1929 – 2 April 2003) was a New Zealand cricketer. He played in one first-class match for Canterbury in 1955/56. His son John played Test cricket for New Zealand.

See also
 List of Canterbury representative cricketers

References

External links
 

1929 births
2003 deaths
New Zealand cricketers
Canterbury cricketers
People from Darfield, New Zealand
Cricketers from Canterbury, New Zealand